Charles Lee Evans (born December 12, 1971) is a retired American professional basketball player, and former coach of British team Worcester Wolves.

Evans was born in Atlanta, Georgia. A 1.80 m tall point guard, he led the 1994–95 Euroleague in assists with 6.2 per game. At the time he was playing for Russian club CSKA Moscow. Later he played in Germany with the Bayer Giants Leverkusen and Alba Berlin. 
In 2007, he signed for British Basketball League side Worcester Wolves, joining the club at the same time as fellow Americans James Life and Anthony Paez. As starting point guard that year, he recorded two triple doubles, in back-to-back home games, and was widely thought of as the best creative point guard in the BBL and received an honourable mention for Player of the Month in March 2008. At the end of the season, he moved to rival BBL side Everton Tigers, for whom he played for one season before returning to coach Worcester Wolves. He is also writing a regular column for the local newspaper, the Worcester Evening News.

External links 
Fibaeurope.com Profile
Evans appointed head coach of Worcester Wolves
Evans records Triple Double against Guildford

References 

1971 births
Living people
Alba Berlin players
Basketball players from Atlanta
American expatriate basketball people in Germany
American expatriate basketball people in the United Kingdom
American expatriate basketball people in Russia
Bayer Giants Leverkusen players
Mississippi State Bulldogs men's basketball players
PBC CSKA Moscow players
Worcester Wolves players
Mersey Tigers players
American men's basketball players
Point guards
American expatriate sportspeople in England